Trinity Metro is a transit agency located in and serving the city of Fort Worth, Texas and its suburbs in surrounding Tarrant County, part of the Dallas–Fort Worth metropolitan area. Since 1983, it was previously known officially as the Fort Worth Transportation Authority (FWTA), and branded itself as The T. As of January 29, 2018 the Board of Directors has voted to rebrand bus services as Trinity Metro, replacing the previous and long standing name.

Trinity Metro primarily operates the region's bus service, and TEXRail, a hybrid rail system connecting downtown Fort Worth with DFW Airport via Northeast Tarrant County. The agency is also involved in the operation of the Trinity Railway Express (TRE) commuter rail line between from downtown Fort Worth and downtown Dallas in partnership with Dallas Area Rapid Transit and the North Texas Xpress (Route 64) express bus service in partnership with Denton County Transportation Authority.

History
Through the early 1970s, bus transit services in Fort Worth were provided by City Transit Company, a private enterprise. Starting in 1974, the city's Traffic Engineering Department began coordinating bus operations. In 1978, the city established the Fort Worth Department of Transportation, which took over public transit operations.  These operations included the City Transit Service (CITRAN) and the Surface Transportation Service (SURTRAN, a service jointly owned between the cities of Dallas and Fort Worth, shuttling passengers to and from DFW from stops in Dallas (including Dallas Union Station), Fort Worth and Arlington), with transportation services for the handicapped (MITS) being added in 1979.

On November 8, 1983, voters approved formation of The T.  To finance the system, voters levied a half-cent sales tax.  The CITRAN, SURTRAN, and MITS services were folded into the new agency, along with carpool and vanpool coordination.

The agency's first addition came on November 5, 1991 when the small suburb of Lake Worth voted 344–206 in favor of joining the T.  That prompted three more elections on May 2, 1992 when Blue Mound, Forest Hill and Richland Hills had the issue of joining the agency on the ballot.  Blue Mound and Richland Hills voted in favor while Forest Hill declined the measure nearly 2–1.

The T saw its first departure when voters in Lake Worth approved a pullout in September 2003. Service withdrawal became effective on March 21, 2004. Lake Worth had previously tried to pull out in 1996, but that measure failed.  On November 8, 2016, Richland Hills residents voted to withdraw from the agency's services. FWTA's final day of service in Richland Hills was November 23, 2016.

In 2001, the FWTA saw its cooperation efforts with DART pay off as the Trinity Railway Express reached downtown Fort Worth. The other end of the line terminates in downtown Dallas.

The TRE commuter line has a daily ridership of 9,100 and is the thirteenth most-ridden commuter rail system in the country.

On August 24, 2016, Trinity Metro broke ground on TEXRail, the second commuter rail project undertaken by the agency, and the first built solely by Trinity Metro. The rail line was initially envisioned to run along the existing Cotton Belt Railway Corridor from DFW airport to the Fort Worth Stockyards, head South along Union Pacific owned track to the Fort Worth Central Station, and continue along Fort Worth & Western Railroad tracks to Benbrook Lake. As of the FWTA 2015 master plan, citing "project costs and other considerations", the agency decided to build the 27 mile Minimum Operable Segment (MOS) between downtown Fort Worth and DFW Terminal B. The other considerations likely included stalled negotiations with Fort Worth & Western, Union Pacific, and DART, over securing right of way for TEXRail trains. The MOS included 2 new stations in Fort Worth, one in Grapevine, two at DFW Airport, and 3 potential stations in North Richland Hills and Haltom City. The three potential stations were conditional on either city joining the Trinity Metro service area, which requires imposing a half-cent sales tax to help fund the agency. North Richland Hills joined Trinity Metro in 2018, while Haltom City never did, as a result, two stations were built in North Richland Hills, and the Haltom City station was not. The MOS was completed, and TEXRail began service between downtown Fort Worth and DFW airport on January 10, 2019, with free rides until January 31, 2019 to " give everyone an opportunity to ride".

On January 29, 2018, the transit agency's board of directors voted to rebrand FWTA/The T as Trinity Metro, and revealed a new logo, that depicts three triangles forming the letter "M" in its negative spaces. The name change officially took place on March 23, 2018 on its website and social media presence.

Member cities
In its 1983 creation, Trinity Metro, then known as the Fort Worth Transit Authority, consisted of only one city, Fort Worth. Over the next 10 years, three small communities joined Trinity Metro, only one of which remains a member city. No new cities joined Trinity Metro until 2006, when Grapevine joined the authority in response to the promise of TEXRail. Later, in 2018, the city of North Richland Hills joined Trinity Metro, also in response to potential economic development associated with TEXRail. This made North Richland Hills the second largest member city behind Fort Worth.

Below is a table displaying current and former Trinity Metro member cities, when they joined the authority, and if applicable, when they left.

Services offered
The bulk of Trinity Metro's operations involve 37 bus routes within Tarrant County. Most route through downtown Fort Worth, where the TRE has two train stations, Fort Worth Central Station and T&P Station. Fort Worth Central Station is the major transit station for Trinity Metro, where the TEXRail and TRE commuter rail lines and twenty-five bus routes meet. Prior to opening in 2001, the main downtown transit hub centered around bus lines all converging along the Houston/Throckmorton corridor, with northbound service on Throckmorton Street and southbound service on Houston Street – between Lancaster Avenue and Belknap Street.

Trinity Metro also operates a vanpool/carpool service. A vanpool/carpool is a group of at least seven people who share the costs of getting to and from work. These individuals usually live and work near each other. Monthly fares will vary, depending on the origination point of the van and the daily miles involved. Riders pay only for the portion of the trip they use. For instance, if the service picks up riders in different counties, it's possible for some riders to pay more than others.

The last service Trinity Metro offers is Trinity Metro ACCESS (formerly MITS - Mobility Impaired Transportation Service). It offers door-to-door transportation within the service areas of Forest Hill, Fort Worth, Blue Mound and River Oaks. Trained drivers are available to assist passengers in boarding and alighting vehicles specially designed to accommodate the mobility impaired.

Rail
TEXRail, a hybrid rail (light rail with some features similar to commuter rail) line connecting downtown Fort Worth with DFW Airport through Northeast Tarrant County
Trinity Railway Express, a commuter rail service connecting downtown Fort Worth and downtown Dallas, jointly operated with Dallas Area Rapid Transit (DART)

Bus routes
, Trinity Metro operates 27 regular bus routes, six Xpress/Limited routes, and four trolley/special services.

 1 – Hemphill
 2 – Camp Bowie
 4 – East Rosedale
 5 – Evans Ave/Sierra Vista
 6 – 8th Ave/McCart
 11 – North Beach/Mercantile Center
 12 – Samuels/Mercantile Center
 15 – Stockyards/North Main
 16 – Alliance Town Center/Mercantile Center Station
 21 – Boca Raton
 22 – Meadowbrook
 23 – TCC Northeast Campus/TRE
 24 – Berry Street
 25 – Miller/E. Seminary
 28 – Mansfield Hwy/Sierra Vista
 45 – TCC Northwest/Angle Ave
 46 – Jacksboro Highway
 51 – Bryant Irvin
 52 – Hulen
 53 – University
 54 – Riverside/Sylvania
 55 – Handley
 72 – Hemphill/Sycamore School Rd
 89 – SPUR/East Lancaster
 91 – Normandale/North Side Station

Xpress/Limited routes 
 30 – CentrePort Circulator (Amon Carter Loop / East Loop / West Loop)
 31 – TRE Link (CentrePort/DFW Airport station–DFW Airport Terminal B station)
 61X – Normandale Xpress
 63X – North Park & Ride Xpress
 65X – South Park & Ride Xpress
 66X – Candleridge/Altamesa Xpress

Trolleys/Special services 
 991 – Juror Shuttle
 LL – Burnett Plaza Lunch Line
 Molly the Trolley
 The Dash

Eliminated
1N North Main (now 15)
1S Hemphill (now 1)
2W Camp Bowie
2E East Lancaster (now 89 SPUR)
7 University Drive
8 Riverside/Evans (Sunday Only)
9 Ramey/Vickery
10 Bailey
16 Downtown Trolley
16 Rosedale/Montgomery
17 Central Avenue
20 Handley
23 Mercantile
26 Ridgmar Mall/Normandale
27 Como/Ridgmar Mall
28 Diamond Hill
29 TCU Frog Shuttle (earlier TCU Circulator)
31 Sycamore School Road
31 Stonegate/TCU Shuttle
32 Bryant Irvin
40 Bridgewood
41 Richland Hills Rider Request
42 Southeast Rider Request
43 Town Center Rider Request/Fixed
44 Central/Azle Ave
44 Alta Mesa Rider Request
45 Forest Park/Mistletoe Heights
46 Lake Worth Rider Request
47 Northsider Rider Request
48 Northside (originally Samuels)
57 Como/Montgomery
60X Eastside Xpress (Temporarily Suspended)
61X Normandale Xpress
62 Summerfields Express
64 East Lancaster Express
64X North Texas Xpress (Denton)
67X TCC Southeast Campus XPress
67 Dallas Express
67 Lamar Blvd. Park & Ride
68 Park Springs Park & Ride
69 Alliance Express
71 Forest Hill
72 Hemphill/Sycamore School Road
82 Southeast Zone Rider Request
83 Southeast Zone Rider Request
89 SPUR/East Lancaster
90 Long Ave
91 Ridgmar Mall/Stockyards
111 Bell Helicopter Shuttle

Labor relations
From November 6, 2006 through November 11, 2006, around 100 of FWTA's union workers went on strike, citing the agency's policy regarding termination of employees who had used up their short-term disability benefits.  This represented about a third of the workers represented by Teamsters Local 997.  Service continued with delays the next morning by non-striking drivers, and FWTA began advertising for replacement drivers.  During the dispute, bus rides on FWTA were free, and the agency announced that monthly pass holders will receive a 25% discount on their December passes.  By Friday, replacement workers and other drivers willing to cross the picket lines had restored service to normal levels.

FWTA offered a new contract proposal late in the week, which was rejected on Saturday by a vote of 37 to 21.  But because less than half of the 155 union members voted, a 2/3 majority of the vote was required to reject the contract.  That would have required 39 of the 58 votes, so the contract was declared "accepted".

Service on the Trinity Railway Express was not affected, as the rail line's employees work under a different contract.

Nine years earlier, a four-day strike in 1997 shut down 75% of The T's service.

Notes

References

External links
 Trinity Metro
 Transit-Oriented Development

Bus transportation in Texas
Intermodal transportation authorities in Texas
Organizations established in 1983
Transportation in Fort Worth, Texas